Dixonius is a genus of Asian geckos, commonly known as leaf-toed geckos.

Etymology
The generic name, Dixonius, is in honor of American herpetologist James R. Dixon.

Species
There are thirteen species that are recognized as being valid.

Nota bene: A binomial authority in parentheses indicates that the species was originally described in a genus other than Dixonius.

References

 
Geckos
Reptiles of Southeast Asia
Lizard genera
Taxa named by William Roy Branch